Maculelê is an Afro-Brazilian dance where a number of people gather in a circle called a roda.

Form
In the roda, one or more atabaques positioned at the entrance of the circle. Each person brandishes a pair of long sticks, traditionally made from biriba, canzi, or pitia wood from Brazil. As the Maculelê rhythm plays on the atabaque, the people in the circle begin rhythmically striking the sticks together. The leader sings, and the people in the circle respond by singing the chorus of the songs. When the leader gives the signal to begin playing Maculelê, two people enter the circle, and to the rhythm of the atabaque, they begin striking their own and each other's sticks together. On the first three beats, they strike their own sticks together, making expressive and athletic dance movements, and on each fourth beat, they strike each other's respective right-hand stick together. This makes for a dance that looks like "mock stick combat". (Also, traditionally in Maculelê, the players wear dried grass skirts).

Maculelê has steps similar to many other Brazilian dances such as "frevo" from Pernanbuco, "Moçambique" from São Paulo, "Cana-verde" from Vassouras-RJ, "Bate-pau" from Mato Grosso, "Tudundun" from Pará among others.

Capoeira
In some capoeira schools, students perform maculelê using a pair of machetes or facones (facão in Portuguese; plural: facões).  These large knives are associated with the tools used by slaves in plantations. The knives spark as they strike in the air, and the sparks along with the sounds of the knives striking one another make this performance particularly impressive. Because a fast moving dance with large knives is dangerous, only very experienced capoeiristas will use knives.

Origins
The origins of Maculelê are obscure, and there are many stories, theories and beliefs that claim "this is how Maculelê came to be". Here are three:

During the slavery era in Brazil, the slaves in the sugarcane plantations would gather and play Maculelê as a game to vent their anger and frustration from being slaves. At this time, machetes were used instead of sticks. Sticks were later incorporated for safety reasons. However, some experts still use machetes.
There were two tribes in Brazil: a peaceful tribe, and a warlike pirate one. For stealing supplies and raping this tribe would repeatedly attack the peaceful tribe, who had no way of defending themselves. One day, during an attack, a young boy named "Maculelê" picked up a pair of sticks and fought off the other tribe. The other tribe never attacked again. His home tribe then made a mock combat dance using sticks and named the dance "Maculelê" in his honor and memory.
An interior West African village was embroiled in a regional conflict.  All of the warriors of the village were called to the front lines to defend their people from invaders.  All of the able bodied men gathered their arms and went to join the battle.  The next day, the villagers were awakened to find their small village, supposedly far from the battle, was being attacked by part of the invading army.  With no warriors left to defend the village, an unlikely hero emerged.  A young boy took up two simple sticks and inspired the remaining villagers to mount a fearless defense.  His heroic efforts became legend are represented in the Maculelê.

Maculelê is sometimes practiced by itself, but is quite often practiced alongside capoeira, and is featured in many capoeira performances. Maculelê and Capoeira are fairly similar in style and reason.

In popular culture
Maculelê was performed as a group dance in the Canadian version of So You Think You Can Dance.

See also
 Weapon Dance
 Morris Dance
 Colombian grima, martial art sport using the related sticks and weapons

References

External links
Maculele interview with mestre popo
Lyrics and videos of Maculele songs and music
 Article on Maculelê from Instituto Palmeiras 

Capoeira
Brazilian dances
Circle dances